Ilir Nallbani (born 11 July 1982) is a Kosovar former footballer who played as a  midfielder.

Playing  career

Club
Nallbani appeared in the 2008–09 UEFA Cup qualifying round.

International
He played in three unofficial matches for Kosovo between 2005 and 2010 with his final match being the first for Kosovo since the declaration of independence. They were only granted UEFA Membership in 2016.

Managerial career
After he retired from football in April 2016 he was named as the head coach of KF Besa after Arbnor Morina was sacked.

References

1982 births
Living people
Sportspeople from Peja
Association football midfielders
Kosovan footballers
Kosovo pre-2014 international footballers
KF Besa players
FC Tatabánya players
KF Elbasani players
KF Vllaznia Shkodër players
KF Trepça players
KF Liria players
Football Superleague of Kosovo players
Kategoria Superiore players
Kosovan expatriate footballers
Expatriate footballers in Albania
Kosovan expatriate sportspeople in Albania
Kosovan football managers
Expatriate footballers in Hungary
Kosovan expatriate sportspeople in Hungary